Gooden is a surname. Notable people with the surname include:

 Ahmad Gooden (born 1995), American football player
 Arthur Henry Gooden (1879–1971), British playwright
 Billy Gooden (1923–1998), Canadian ice hockey player
 C. Harrie Gooden (1867–1905) Australian painter
 Drew Gooden (born 1981), American basketball player
 Drew Gooden (comedian) (born 1993), American comedian
 Dwight Gooden (born 1964), American baseball player
 Lancelot Gooden, Australian architect who worked with Daniel Garlick in Adelaide in the early 20th century
 Sam Gooden (1934–2022), American soul singer, member of The Impressions
 Stacy-Ann Gooden (21st century), American model and journalist
 Stephen Gooden (1892–1955), British artist and engraver
 Tavares Gooden (born 1984), American college football player
 Ty Gooden (born 1972), English footballer